Amruta Subhash is an Indian actress who works in Marathi and Hindi films, television, and theatre. She is a graduate of the National School of Drama, New Delhi.
She won the National Film Award for Best Supporting Actress for the Marathi-language film Astu (2015) and the Filmfare Award for Best Supporting Actress for the Hindi-language film Gully Boy (2019).

Career
Subhash made her debut with the National Award-winning film and India's Oscar entry for the year 2004, Shwaas.

She won a National Film Award for Best Supporting Actress in 2013 for her role in the Marathi film Astu and has starred in numerous critically acclaimed films that have won various awards around the world, such as the Crystal Bear at the Berlin International Film Festival and the Fedeora Award at the Venice Film Festival.

Subhash is also a classically trained singer who has lent her voice to various Marathi films.

As a playback singer, she has won accolades such as the Maharashtra Government State Award for the film Nital. Recently, she starred in the Netflix Original series Selection Day (2018–19), and opposite Nawazuddin Siddiqui in Sacred Games Season 2 (2019).

Subhash was a student at S P College, Pune. She started her acting career in theatre. She graduated from the National School of Drama, New Delhi, where she studied under Satyadev Dubey. While there, she appeared in various plays, including Urvashiam (1997), Bela Meri Jaan (1998), House of Bernada, Alba (1998), and Mrug Trushna (1999). Returning to Maharashtra, she appeared in various Marathi plays, including  Tee Fulrani. This role, previously portrayed by Bhakti Barve, brought her into the spotlight. Adapted along the lines of My Fair Lady, which in turn is based on George Bernard Shaw's famous play Pygmalion, the play is written by Pu La Deshpande. Later, Subhash featured in many Marathi films and television series, playing supporting roles, and then moved into lead roles. She is also a trained Bharatanatyam dancer.

Subhash portrayed the role ex bar dancer Lily in the Netflix series Bombay Begums, directed by Alankrita Shrivastava.

Films and television
Subhash made her film debut in the 2004 film Shwaas, which won Best Feature Film at the 51st National Film Awards. The film was also the official entry from India to the 77th Academy Awards in the category Best Foreign Language Film; it did not reach the nomination list, however. Subhash went on to act in a number of Hindi-language films. Her next project was Chausar. Directed by Sagar Sarhadi, whose 1982 film Bazaar was critically acclaimed, Subhash called the role a "dream come true". The same year, she played the title role in the television film Nirmala, directed by Gulzar, based on Premchand's novel of the same name. Aired on Doordarshan in October 2004, the film was the last episode in Gulzar's series Tehreer.... Munshi Premchand Ki, adapted from Premchand's stories. She also acted in the series Ek Prem Katha, directed by Basu Chatterjee.

Subhash was next seen playing various roles in TV shows, such as Zoka, Paaulkhuna, and most importantly, Awaghachi Sansaar, which aired on Zee Marathi. She became popular for her role of Aasawari opposite actor Prasad Oak, where she fights back against the atrocities laid upon her by her husband.

Her 2005 film White Rainbow was based on the stories of the widows of Vrindavan, where she played a 15-year-old widow who is forced into prostitution. In 2008, she appeared in a supporting role in Nandita Das's debut directorial venture Firaaq, based on the aftermath of the 2002 communal riots in Gujarat. Critically acclaimed, nationally as well as in various international festivals, the film showcased several notable actors including Naseeruddin Shah, Paresh Rawal, and Deepti Naval. The same year, the Marathi-language comedy Valu was released. Directed by Umesh Vinayak Kulkarni, the film included Atul Kulkarni, Mohan Agashe, Bharati Achrekar, Girish Kulkarni, Dilip Prabhavalkar, among others. The film also featured Subhash's mother, Jyoti Subhash.

Her 2009 film Tya Ratri Paus Hota cast her as a drug-addicted teenager. The same year, she appeared in Sachin Kundalkar's film Gandha. Subhash's mother played her fictional mother in the production. The film was later adapted into Hindi by Kundalkar as Aiyyaa in 2012.

Theater

Along with her film career, Subhash has acted in a number of theatre plays, including Sathecha Kaay Karayacha! and Shree Tashi Sau. In Sathecha Kaay Karayacha!, directed by her husband Sandesh Kulkarni, Subhas played the role of Salma, an understanding wife who tries to solve the problems of her husband who falls prey to self-torturing jealousy. In Ajuni Yeto Vaas Fhulana, director Chetan Datar paid tribute to veteran theatre personality Satyadev Dubey. While Dubey was played by Nandu Madhav, Subhas played the role of an experienced student of Dubey. She also appeared in the play Chhotyashya Suteet, which was written by Sachin Kundalkar. In 2008, she  acted in the play Love Birds, directed by Girish Joshi. The suspense thriller play was well appreciated by the audience for its innovative way of mixing in video clips. She played the role of a wife whose husband (played by Aniket Vishwasrao) has lost his memory and is learning bitter truths about her as he recovers. In 2020, she acted in a Hindi-language play titled Phir Se Honeymoon, written and directed by her husband, Sandesh Kulkarni, about a couple that decides to go on a second honeymoon in an effort to revive their relationship. However, the play had to be put on hold due to the COVID-19 pandemic. In 2022, the play was revived in Marathi and retitled Punashcha Honeymoon.

Singing
Subhash studied classical singing for three years. Her debut album, Jata Jata Pawasane, was not successful commercially. She has featured as a playback singer in films like Haapus (2010) and Ajintha (2012) and has provided background music to the films Nital (2006) and Teen Bahene. In 2012, she participated in the Marathi singing competition Sa Re Ga Ma Pa, organised for celebrities. She went to the top 5 and competed in the finale along with Ajay Purkar, Ketki Thatte, Vaibhav Mangle, and Prashant Damle, with Damle winning the competition.

Selected filmography

Film

Television

Awards

In 2006, Subhash was awarded the Best Actress award for her role in the TV show Avaghachi Sansar, presented by Zee Marathi Awards. She has also received the V. Shantaram Award for her role in the film Savalee. In 2014,
she got the National Film Award for Best Supporting Actress for her film Astu, directed by Sumitra Bhave–Sunil Sukthankar (shared with Aida El-Kashef), and the Crystal Bear for Best Film, awarded by the children's jury in the Generation Kplus section at the 64th Berlin International Film Festival, for the movie Killa.

Awards and nominations

Personal life
Subhash's birth name is Amruta Subhashchandra Dhembre. She is the daughter of Jyoti Subhash. She has said her interest in acting was inspired by her mother. They two have acted together in many films, including Aaji, Zoka, Gandha, Masala, Nital, Valu, Badha, Vihir, and Gully Boy and the play Kalokhachya Leki. Jyoti Subhas played the role of Amruta's grandmother in Aaji and that of her mother in the 2009 film Gandha. Subhash is married to director Sandesh Kulkarni. Kulkarni has directed Subhash in plays such as Sathecha Kaay Karayacha! and Pahila Vahila.
The actress supports various social causes. She is a brand ambassador for Zee Marathi Jagruti, an initiative by Zee Marathi Channel Group, for the empowerment of Marathi women. Her sister-in-law is Sonali Kulkarni, who is also film actress.

References

External links

 
 

1979 births
Living people
Actresses from Pune
Indian film actresses
Indian television actresses
Indian web series actresses
Actresses in Marathi cinema
Actresses in Hindi cinema
Actresses in Malayalam cinema
Actresses in Marathi television
Actresses in Hindi television
Actresses in Marathi theatre
National School of Drama alumni
Marathi actors
Best Supporting Actress National Film Award winners
Filmfare Awards winners
20th-century Indian actresses
21st-century Indian actresses